Paleopyrenomycites is a Devonian genus of fungus of uncertain phylogenetic affinity within the Pezizomycotina total group, known from the Rhynie chert.

Ascomycota
Prehistoric fungi
Pragian life